Joseph Bédier (28 January 1864 – 29 August 1938) was a French writer and scholar and historian of medieval France.

Biography
Bédier was born in Paris, France, to Adolphe Bédier, a lawyer of Breton origin, and spent his childhood in Réunion. He was a professor of medieval French literature at the Université de Fribourg, Switzerland (1889–1891) and the Collège de France, Paris (c. 1893).

Modern theories of the fabliaux and the chansons de geste are based on two of Bédier's studies.

Bédier revived interest in several important old French texts, including Le roman de Tristan et Iseut (1900), La chanson de Roland (1921), and Les fabliaux (1893). He was a member of the Académie française from 1920 until his death.

His Tristan et Iseut was translated into Cornish by A. S. D. Smith, into English by Hilaire Belloc and Paul Rosenfeld, and into German by Rudolf G. Binding. In 2013, a new English translation by Edward J. Gallagher was published by Hackett Publishing Company.

Bédier was also joint editor of the two-volume Littérature française, one of the most valuable modern general histories of French literature. He was elected a Foreign Honorary Member of the American Academy of Arts and Sciences in 1929.

Bédier died in Le Grand-Serre, France.

Military diaries
Bédier used the war diaries of German soldiers of different military ranks in World War I as a source for various articles dealing with what he describes as atrocities inflicted upon Belgian civilians and French soldiers. Some of these diaries had been kept for military reasons: in order to provide daily accounts of troop movements, orders, engagements, losses etc. Others were private diaries. From them Bédier connected together accounts of thirty-six incidents of what he saw as sexual and sadistic crimes by the German soldiers.

Works
Le lai de l’ombre (1890)
Le fabliau de Richeut (1891)
Les fabliaux, études de littérature populaire et d’histoire littéraire du Moyen Âge (1893)
De Nicolao Museto (gallice Colin Muset), francogallico carminum scriptore (1893)
Le roman de Tristan et Iseut (1900)
Le roman de Tristan par Thomas (2 vol., 1902–1905)
Études critiques (1903)
Les deux poèmes de la folie Tristan (1907)
Légendes épiques, recherches sur la formation des chansons de geste (1908–1913)
Les chansons de croisade (1909)
Les chansons de Colin Muset (1912)
Les crimes allemands d’après les témoignages allemands (1915)
Comment l’Allemagne essaie de justifier ses crimes? (1915)
Joseph Bédier and Paul Hazard: Histoire de la littérature francaise. 2 Vol. (1923/24)
L’effort français (1919)
La chanson de Roland (critical edition, 1920)
La chanson de Roland (after the Oxford manuscript, 1922)
Commentaires sur la chanson de Roland (1927)

References

Further reading

External links

 
 
  
 
 More about Bédier (in French)

1864 births
1938 deaths
19th-century French historians
20th-century French historians
École Normale Supérieure alumni
Fellows of the American Academy of Arts and Sciences
French medievalists
Lycée Louis-le-Grand teachers
Academic staff of the Collège de France
Members of the Académie Française
Writers from Paris
French people of Breton descent
Academic staff of the University of Fribourg
Textual scholarship
Corresponding Fellows of the Medieval Academy of America
French male non-fiction writers